Dickson Daudi (born 10 April 1986) is a Tanzanian football defender who plays for Mtibwa Sugar.

References

1986 births
Living people
Tanzanian footballers
Tanzania international footballers
Mtibwa Sugar F.C. players
Association football defenders
Tanzanian Premier League players